Sieniawka may refer to the following places in Poland:
Sieniawka in Gmina Łagiewniki, Dzierżoniów County in Lower Silesian Voivodeship (SW Poland)
Sieniawka in Gmina Bogatynia, Zgorzelec County in Lower Silesian Voivodeship (SW Poland)